Prunières is a commune in the Hautes Alpes department in southeastern France.

Geography
It is close to Chorges which is the closest commerce town. Bigger towns near Prunières include Gap (25 km) to the west or Embrun (15 km) to the east.
Prunières is located close to the Lac de Serre-Ponçon, one of the largest artificial lakes in Western Europe, and surrounded by gorgeous mountains.

Population

Tourism
The main activity in the winter is skiing, while one can enjoy mountain climbing/hiking and water activities on the Lac de Serre-Ponçon.

See also
Communes of the Hautes-Alpes department

References

Communes of Hautes-Alpes